Ballynahow Castle is a tower house and a National Monument in County Tipperary, Ireland.

Location

History

Ballynahow Castle was built in the early 16th century by the Purcell family, an Old English family who held the title of Baron of Loughmoe. The lower floors were used in the 1840s as a cottage. The tower house was transferred to state ownership in 1930.

The tower house

The tower house (caiseal) rises  to the chemin de ronde, off which are four evenly spaced machicolations. It is five storeys tall with slit windows and large fireplaces on the second and fourth levels. A hole in the north wall on the fourth level leads to a secret chamber set into the walls. Originally the top level was covered by a conical timber roof carried on squinches.

References

National Monuments in County Tipperary
Castles in County Tipperary